Anthony Campolo (born February 25, 1935) is an American sociologist, Baptist pastor, author, public speaker and former spiritual advisor to U.S. President Bill Clinton. Campolo is known as one of the most influential leaders in the evangelical left and has been a major proponent of progressive thought and reform within the evangelical community. He has also become a leader of the Red-Letter Christian movement, which aims to put emphasis on the teachings of Jesus. Campolo is a popular commentator on religious, political, and social issues, and has been a guest on programs such as The Colbert Report, The Charlie Rose Show, Larry King Live, Nightline, Crossfire, Politically Incorrect and The Hour.

Early life and education
Campolo graduated from Eastern College in 1956, and later Eastern Baptist Theological Seminary (now Palmer Theological Seminary).  He earned a PhD from Temple University. He was ordained a Baptist minister and evangelist.

Career
He is professor emeritus of sociology at Eastern University in St. David's, Pennsylvania where he has taught, on and off, since 1964. For ten years, he also taught at the University of Pennsylvania.

He became an associate pastor of the Mount Carmel Baptist Church in West Philadelphia, which is affiliated with both the National Baptist Convention, USA, Inc. and the American Baptist Churches USA. He commuted often to the church from his home in St. Davids, Pennsylvania. 
Campolo founded the Evangelical Association for the Promotion of Education (EAPE), which works to help "at-risk" youth in the U.S. and Canada, and has helped to establish several schools and universities. His best known work is his "It's Friday, But Sunday's Coming!" sermon, recordings of which have been widely circulated in evangelical circles, and which is based on a sermon by a black minister at Mount Carmel Baptist Church. He is a frequent speaker at Christian conferences. He was also one of several spiritual advisers to President Bill Clinton during the Monica Lewinsky scandal where he met with president Clinton at the White House.

Campolo was the subject of an informal heresy hearing in 1985 brought about by several assertions in his 1983 book A Reasonable Faith, particularly his claim that, "Jesus is actually present in each other person". The book became a hot button issue, and the controversy caused Campus Crusade for Christ and Youth for Christ to block a planned speaking engagement by Campolo. The Christian Legal Society empowered a "reconciliation panel", led by noted theologian J. I. Packer, to examine the issue and resolve the controversy. The panel examined the book and questioned Campolo. The panel issued a statement saying that although it found Campolo's statements "methodologically naïve and verbally incautious", it did not find them to be heretical.

In March 2011, Campolo began hosting the TV show Red Letter Christians, aired on JC-TV. This weekly half-hour talk show features interviews with leaders in the Red-Letter Christian movement.

On January 14, 2014, Campolo announced his plans to retire from leading the EAPE and to close that ministry. The extra money in the ministry will be distributed to offshoot ministries started by EAPE; however, he plans to continue writing and speaking.

Views on religion and politics 
Although he has associated himself with the Democratic Party and several other modern liberal groups and causes, he has publicly stated his opposition to abortion. Campolo holds a consistent life ethic stance in opposition to any human situation that leads to the termination of life including warfare, poverty/starvation (as caused by extreme wealth inequalities), capital punishment, and euthanasia.

Starting in the late 1980s, Campolo's left-leaning political beliefs began to put leaders of the Christian right, such as Gary Bauer and Jerry Falwell, at odds with him. Despite his criticisms of political conservatives in the evangelical community, Campolo has also criticized the more liberal mainline Christian denominations because "they fail to emphasize a personal, transforming relationship with Jesus Christ."

Along with his wife, Peggy Campolo, he has participated in very public debates and discussions about the place of lesbians and gays within church and society. Campolo formerly contended that homosexuality was a sin in practice, although not in orientation, while his wife disagreed, holding that committed, monogamous homosexual practice was not a sin; she supports full equality for LGBT people. Regarding marriage, he stated that all couples should have the right to a civil union with all the legal rights that are associated with such a contract.

On June 8, 2015, Campolo released a statement changing his position on the issue of gay relationships, and stating that he now supported full acceptance of Christian gay couples into the Church. He cited several reasons including the institution of marriage primarily being about spiritual growth instead of procreation, what he had learned through his friendships with gay Christian couples, and past examples of exclusionary church traditions practiced "by sincere believers, but most of us now agree that they were wrong."

Personal life 
Tony married the former Peggy Davidson on June 7, 1958. Their daughter, Lisa, was born in 1960 and their son, Bart, was born in 1963.

Campolo's son is Bart Campolo, a former evangelical preacher who left Christianity and transitioned to secular humanism. The two have engaged in an ongoing conversation since Bart announced to him that he no longer believes in God. They have co-authored a book exploring the issues at the heart of this conversation, and a documentary film (Leaving My Father's Faith) was released in 2018 which features the conversations between them and tell the story of Bart's journey out of faith.

Published works 
 The Success Fantasy (1980, Victory Press)
 The Power Delusion (1983, Victory Press)
 A Reasonable Faith (1983, Lightning Source Inc.)
 Ideas for Social Action: A Handbook on Mission and Service for Christian Young People (1984, Zondervan)
 You Can Make a Difference (1984, Word Publishing Group)
 It's Friday, But Sunday's Comin (1984, Word Publishing Group)
 Partly Right: Christianity Responds to Its Critics (1985, Word)
 Seven Deadly Sins (1987)
 Who Switched the Price Tags (1987, Thomas Nelson Publishers)
 20 Hot Potatoes Christians Are Afraid to Touch (1988, Word Publishing)
 Growing up in America : A Sociology of Youth Ministry (1989, Zondervan Publishing House)
 Things We Wish We Had Said: Reflections of a Father and His Grown Son (co-written with Bart Campolo) (1989, W Publishing Group)
 Wake Up America!: Answering God's Radical Call While Living In the Real World (1991, Harpercollins)
 How to Be Pentecostal Without Speaking in Tongues (1991, Word Publishing)
 Sociology through the Eyes of Faith (1992)
 How to Rescue the Earth Without Worshiping Nature: a Christian's Call to Save Creation (1992, Thomas Nelson Publishers)
 Everything You've Heard Is Wrong (1992, Word Publishing)
 The Kingdom of God Is a Party: God's Radical Plan for His Family (1992, Word Publishing Group)
 Stand Up and Be Counted (1993)
 Carpe Diem (1994, Word Publishing)
 Is Jesus a Republican or a Democrat?: And 14 Other Polarizing Issues (1995, Word Publishing Group) {published as Was Jesus a Moderate? outside the US}
 Can Mainline Denominations Make a Comeback? (1995)
 Following Jesus Without Embarrassing God (1997, Word Publishing Group)
 Let Me Tell You a Story: Life Lessons from Unexpected Places And Unlikely People (2000, Word Publishing)
 Revolution and Renewal: How Churches Are Saving Our Cities (2000, Westminster/John Knox)
 Which Jesus: Choosing Between Love and Power (Nashville TN: Word Publishing Group, 2002).
 The Survival Guide for Christians on Campus: How to be Students and Disciples at the Same Time (Co-Written by William Willimon) (2002, Howard Publishing Co)
 Adventures in Missing the Point: How the Culture-Controlled Church Neutered the Gospel (co-written with Brian D. McLaren) (2003, Youth Specialties)
 Speaking My Mind: The Radical Evangelical Prophet Tackles the Tough Issues Christians Are Afraid To Face (2004, Word Publishing)
 The Church Enslaved: A Spirituality for Racial Reconciliation (co-written with Michael Battle) (2005, Augsburg Fortress Publishers)
 Letters to a Young Evangelical  (2006, Basic Books)
 It's Friday But Sunday's Comin' The God of Intimacy and Action  (co-written with Mary Darling) (2007, Jossey-Bass)
 Red Letter Christians: A Citizen's Guide to Faith and Politics (2008, Regal Books)
 Stories That Feed Your Soul (2010, Regal)
 Connecting Like Jesus (with Mary Albert Darling) (2010, Jossey-Bass)
 Red Letter Revolution: What If Jesus Really Meant What He Said? (with Shane Claiborne) (2012, Thomas Nelson)
 The God of Intimacy and Action: Reconnecting Ancient Spiritual Practices, Evangelicalism and Justice (with Mary Albert Darling) (2013, SPCK Publishing)

References

External links 
 
 Red Letter Christians Blog, by Tony Campolo and friends
 
 with Tony Campolo  by Stephen McKiernan, Binghamton University Libraries Center for the Study of the 1960s, September 3, 1997

1935 births
Living people
Clergy from Philadelphia
Baptist writers
American writers of Italian descent
Eastern University (United States)
American sociologists
Temple University alumni
Palmer Theological Seminary alumni
American Christian pacifists
University of Pennsylvania faculty
21st-century Baptist ministers from the United States
Christian humanists
20th-century Baptist ministers from the United States